George Huntley is an American singer, guitarist, and songwriter, best known as a member of The Connells from 1985 to 2001.

History
George Huntley was a childhood friend of brothers David and Mike Connell. Huntley performed solo acts for The Connells at many of their early shows. After the band began playing larger shows and had a song featured on the Dolphin Records' More Mondo compilation, Huntley expressed interest in joining the band. Shortly after he graduated from the University of North Carolina at Chapel Hill in 1984, he became a member of the band and made his debut on the 1985 Hats Off EP, produced by Don Dixon. Up until 1991 with the addition of keyboardist Steve Potak, Huntley played both lead guitar and keyboards in the band, often switching between both during the same song. He also wrote and sang lead vocals on numerous Connells songs such as "Sal", "Home Today", and "Doin' You". In 1996, he released his first and only solo album titled Brainjunk.

Current activities
After the release of The Connells' 8th album Old School Dropouts, Huntley left the band to spend time on family life and pursue other interests. As of July 2022, he owned and operated Huntley Realty LLC.

References

External links
Huntley Realty
The Connells' website

1962 births
Living people
Songwriters from North Carolina
American rock guitarists
American male guitarists
Musicians from Raleigh, North Carolina
Guitarists from North Carolina
20th-century American guitarists
20th-century American male musicians